John Robin Warren  (born 11 June 1937, in Adelaide) is an Australian pathologist, Nobel Laureate and researcher who is credited with the 1979 re-discovery of the bacterium Helicobacter pylori, together with Barry Marshall. The duo proved to the medical community that the bacterium Helicobacter pylori (H. pylori) is the cause of most peptic ulcers.

Early life and education
Warren received his M.B.B.S. degree from the University of Adelaide, having completed his high school education at St Peter's College, Adelaide.

Career
Warren trained at the Royal Adelaide Hospital and became Registrar in Clinical Pathology at the Institute of Medical and Veterinary Science (IMVS), where he worked in laboratory haematology which generated his interest in pathology.

In 1963, Warren was appointed Honorary Clinical Assistant in Pathology and Honorary Registrar in Haematology at Royal Adelaide Hospital. Subsequently, he lectured in pathology at Adelaide University, then took up the position of Clinical Pathology Registrar at the Royal Melbourne Hospital. In 1967, Warren was elected to the Royal College of Pathologists of Australasia and became a senior pathologist at the Royal Perth Hospital where he spent the majority of his career.

Nobel Prize work
At the University of Western Australia, with his colleague Barry J. Marshall, Warren proved that the bacterium is the infectious cause of stomach ulcers.  Warren helped develop a convenient diagnostic test (-urea breath-test) for detecting H. pylori in ulcer patients.

In 2005, Warren and Marshall were awarded the Nobel Prize in Medicine.

An Australian documentary was made in 2006 about Warren and Marshall's road to the Nobel Prize, called "The Winner's Guide to the Nobel Prize". He was appointed a Companion of the Order of Australia in 2007.

Asteroid 254863 Robinwarren, discovered by Italian amateur astronomer Silvano Casulli in 2005, was named in his honour. The official  was published by the Minor Planet Center on 22 April 2016.

Personal life 
Warren married Winifred Theresa Warren (née Williams) in the early 1960s and together they had five children.  Winifred Warren went on to become an accomplished psychiatrist. Following her death in 1997, Warren retired from medicine.

See also
 Timeline of peptic ulcer disease and Helicobacter pylori

References

External links 
  including the Nobel Lecture Helicobacter - The Ease and Difficulty of a New Discovery
 Robin Warrens homepage

1937 births
Living people
Australian Nobel laureates
Australian pathologists
Companions of the Order of Australia
Fellows of the Australian Academy of Science
Nobel laureates in Physiology or Medicine
People educated at St Peter's College, Adelaide
People from Adelaide
University of Adelaide Medical School alumni
University of Western Australia alumni
Academic staff of the University of Western Australia